The National Ultra Endurance Series (NUE) is an ultra-endurance mountain bike race series in the United States. The number of races has varied from year to year, however, in 2015 and most recent year there have been 14 races in the series distributed around the USA. Each of the races is approximately 100 miles (160 km) long and primarily off-road. The title of series champion is awarded to the racer with the four best results in each of the following categories: Men's Open, Women's Open, Men's Masters (age 50+), and Single speed. Any ties are broken by the placing results in the final race of the series.

History
The series was started in 2006. In the past there were requirements to finish at least one race West of the Mississippi River and one race East of the Mississippi. That requirement has been dropped. The list below includes those races that will be in the 2017 series. Some of these races were run before joining the NUE series.

The series used to include the following events:
Syllamo's Revenge 125k in Arkansas - 2011 to 2013
Tahoe-Sierra 100 in California - 2008 to 2009
The Endurance 100 in Utah - 2007
Bailey Hundo in |Bailey, Colorado 2006 to 2016 (Now in the shorter NUE series)
Fool's Gold 100 in Dahlonega, Georgia 2008 to 2016

Series Champions

See also
 Mohican MTB 100
 Lumberjack 100
 The Endurance 100
 Shenandoah 100
 Breckenridge 100

References

External links
 US National Ultra Endurance Mountain Bike Series

Mountain biking events in the United States
Endurance games